The following article is a summary of the 2022–23 football season in Belgium, which is the 120th season of competitive football in the country and will run from July 2022 until June 2023.

National teams

Belgium national football team

Results and fixtures

Friendlies

UEFA Nations League

Group 4

FIFA World Cup

Group F

UEFA Euro 2024 qualifying

Group F

Belgium women's national football team

Results and fixtures

Friendlies

UEFA Women's Euro

Group D

Knockout stage

2023 FIFA Women's World Cup qualification

Group F

Play-offs

2023 Arnold Clark Cup

UEFA competitions

UEFA Champions League

Group stage

Group B

Knockout phase

Round of 16

|}

UEFA Europa League

Qualifying phase and play-off round

Play-off round

|}

Group stage

Group D

Knockout stage

Round of 16

|}

UEFA Europa Conference League

Qualifying phase and play-off round

Second qualifying round

|}

Third qualifying round

|}

Play-off round

|}

Group stage

Group B

Group F

Knockout stage

Knockout round play-offs

|}

Round of 16

|}

UEFA Youth League

UEFA Champions League Path

Group stage

Group B

Domestic Champions Path

First round

|}

Second round

|}

UEFA Women's Champions League

Qualifying rounds

Round 1

Semi-finals

|}

Final

|}

Men's football

Pro League

Regular season

Challenger Pro League

Amateur Leagues

Belgian National Division 1

Belgian Division 2

Division VFV A

Division VFV B

Division ACFF

Belgian Division 3

Cup competitions

Transfers

Managerial changes
This is a list of changes of managers within Belgian professional league football:

First Division A

First Division B

See also
 2022–23 Belgian First Division A
 2022–23 Belgian First Division B
 2022–23 Belgian National Division 1
 2022–23 Belgian Division 2
 2022–23 Belgian Division 3
 2022–23 Belgian Cup
 2022 Belgian Super Cup

Notes

References

 
Belgium
Belgium